Jacob Clemente (born April 12, 1997) is an American actor and dancer. He is best known for his portrayal of "Billy" in the Broadway production of Billy Elliot: The Musical.

Clemente was born in North Greenbush, New York, on April 12, 1997. He began his study of dance in Colonie, New York, at The World of Dance.

Clemente appeared in regional theatre productions as a boy, including Toy Camp, The Music Man, High School Musical on Stage!, and Seussical. He also participated in dance competitions including with The New York City Dance Alliance (NYCDA).

In 2008, Clemente auditioned for the revival production of Gypsy, starring Patti Lupone. On September 2, he became a replacement in the cast as a "Boy Scout", making his Broadway debut at the age of 11. He remained with the show until it closed on January 11, 2009.

After successfully auditioning for the Broadway production of Billy Elliot: The Musical, Clemente appeared as the "Tall/Posh Boy" and was the understudy for "Michael." His second performance as "Tall/Posh Boy" was on October 3, 2009,  which was the final performance of Kiril Kulish, the Tony Award-winning Broadway preview night Billy.

On April 3, 2010, Clemente became the ninth actor to play the role of "Billy" in the Broadway production of Billy Elliot the Musical. He performed the role for the final time on July 3, 2011.

In 2010, Clemente participated with other Broadway stars in recording the song "It Gets Better," to benefit the Trevor Project. The song was released on iTunes October 19, 2010.

At CES 2011, Clemente played the host character Zoll for the Samsung keynote.

Clemente attended Columbia High School in East Greenbush, New York. In 2015, Clemente began attending Yale College, where he double-majored in Russian and economics. He is a member of a number of performing groups on campus, including the Yale Alley Cats.

Credits

Stage

Film

Awards
NYCDA National Mini Outstanding Dancer 2008 
1st Place Junior Division PrimeTime Albany, NY Regional 2008
NYCDA Boston Regional Mini Outstanding Dancer Dec. 2007
Junior Mr. Starquest, World Finals, Virginia Beach 2007
NYCDA Regionals Outstanding Dancer Runnerup 2007
Regional Petite Mr. Starquest, Albany, NY 2007
2nd Runner Up, Dance Xplosion National Mini Mister Title, July 2006

References

External links 
 
 
 Official Website

1997 births
Living people
American male dancers
American male stage actors
Yale College alumni